Mandibular incisor may refer to:

 Mandibular central incisor
 Mandibular lateral incisor